

Q

Q